Tillandsia denudata is a species of flowering plant in the Bromeliaceae family. It is native to Bolivia, Venezuela and Ecuador.

References

denudata
Flora of Bolivia
Flora of Venezuela
Flora of Ecuador
Taxa named by Édouard André